Angraecum lecomtei is a species of orchid native to Madagascar.

lecomtei
Orchids of Madagascar
Taxa named by Joseph Marie Henry Alfred Perrier de la Bâthie